Damotra (Amharic: ዳሞትራ) is a 1992 crime novel written by the Ethiopian author Moges Kebede in the Amharic language. 

Moges immigrated to the U.S. in 1996 to Minneapolis, Minnesota. He is also the editor of Mestawet Ethiopian Newspaper with circulation over 8,000 in some nine U.S. cities.

References 

1992 novels
Crime novels
Ethiopian literature